The 2011–12 WNBL season was the 32nd season of competition since its establishment in 1981. A total of 10 teams contested the league. The regular season was played between October 2011 and March 2012, followed by a post-season involving the top five in March 2012.  The Bulleen Boomers attempted to defend their title, but fell short at the last phase, losing in the finals to the Dandenong Rangers.

Broadcast rights were held by free-to-air network ABC. ABC broadcast one game a week, at 1:00PM at every standard time in Australia.

Sponsorship included iiNet, entering its second year as league naming rights sponsor. Spalding provided equipment including the official game ball, with Champion supplying team apparel.

Team standings

Finals

Season award winners

Statistics leaders

Source: 2014–15 WNBL Media Guide

External links
2011–12 WNBL Media Guide

 
2011–12 in Australian basketball
Australia
Basketball
Basketball